The Junín-10 Oil Field is an oil field located in the Orinoco Belt. It was discovered in 2009 and developed by PDVSA. The oil field is operated and owned by PDVSA.

See also

List of oil fields

References 

Eastern Venezuela Basin
Oil fields of Venezuela